The Naval Aviation Museum is a military aviation museum located in Bogmalo,  from Vasco da Gama, Goa, India focused on the history of the Indian Naval Air Arm. The museum is divided into two main parts, an outdoor exhibit and a two-storey indoor gallery.

History 
The museum was founded on 12 October 1998 with a collection of 6 aircraft.

Exhibits
The indoor gallery features rooms focused on specific topics. These include naval armament – such as bombs, torpedoes, autocannons, and sensors – and the progression of uniforms of the Indian air and naval forces. A number of aircraft engines are on display outside.

Aircraft on display

 Breguet Alizé IN202
 British Aerospace Sea Harrier FRS.51 IN621
 de Havilland Devon C.1 IN124
 de Havilland Vampire T.55 IN149
 Fairey Firefly TT.1 IN112
 HAL Chetak IN475
 HAL HT-2 BX748
 Hawker Sea Hawk Mk 100 IN234
 Hughes 300 IN083
 Kamov Ka-25 IN573
 Lockheed L1049G Super Constellation IN315
 Short Sealand II IN106
 Westland Sea King Mk 42 IN505

Gallery

See also
 Indian Air Force Museum, Palam

References

External links 

 Naval Aviation Museum

Indian naval aviation
Indian Air Force
Naval museums in India
Museums in Goa
Aerospace museums in India
Buildings and structures in Vasco da Gama, Goa
Education in South Goa district
1998 establishments in Goa
Educational institutions established in 1998